Liao Haochuan (born 14 July 2000) is a Chinese footballer currently playing as a defender for Qingdao Youth Island on loan from Shanghai Shenhua.

Career statistics

Club

References

2000 births
Living people
Chinese footballers
Association football defenders
China League Two players
Shanghai Shenhua F.C. players